The Radioactive Incident Monitoring Network (RIMNET) is a network of 91 monitoring stations, used by the Government of the United Kingdom, which records and analyses the level of radioactivity across the United Kingdom. A reading is taken from each station every hour and an alert triggered if radiation levels for specific isotopes rise significantly above normal background radiation levels at one or more stations.

Stations are distributed all over the UK, but are more concentrated at coastal areas, the rationale for this being the perceived threat of radiation arriving from an overseas incident.  Data is collected at a central computer based in a DEFRA building in central London.  For security reasons, a backup computer is also in operation at a secret location in the UK.

The network was set up in 1988 as a response to the Chernobyl disaster in 1986.

As well as being of use in an emergency, the stations also serve to record historical data on radiation levels.

See also
 Centre for Radiation, Chemical and Environmental Hazards (CRCE) in Oxfordshire

References

 Information

External links
 Official website

Department for Environment, Food and Rural Affairs
Environment of the United Kingdom
Radioactivity